Samuel Merwin, Sr. (6 October 1874 – 17 October 1936) was an American playwright and author.

Biography
Merwin was born on 6 October 1874 in  Evanston, Illinois to Ella B. and Orlando H. Merwin. His father was the postmaster of Evanston. In 1901, Merwin married Edna Earl Fleshiem. The couple had two sons, Samuel Kimball Merwin, Jr. and Banister Merwin and one adopted son, John Merwin.

After attending Northwestern University, he worked between 1905 and 1911 as associate editor and then editor of Success magazine. In 1907 the magazine sent him to China to investigate the opium trade.

He died of a stroke while dining at The Player's Club in Manhattan on 17 October 1936.

Publications

The Short Line War (1899) with Henry Kitchell Webster
Calumet "K" (1901) with Henry Kitchell Webster
The Road to Frontenac:  A Romance of Early Canada (1901)
The Whip Hand (1903)
His Little World: The Story of Hunch Badeau (1903)
The Merry Anne (1904)
The Road Builders (1905)
Comrade John (1907) with Henry Kitchell Webster
Drugging a Nation. (1908)
The Citadel:  A Romance of Unrest (1912)
Anthony the Absolute (1914)
The Charmed Life of Miss Austin (1914)
The Honey Bee:  A Story of a Woman in Revolt (1915)
The Trufflers (1916)
Temperamental Henry:  An Episodic History of the Early Life and the Young Loves of Henry Calverly, 3rd (1917)
Henry Is Twenty:  A Further Episodic History of Henry Calverly, 3rd (1918)
The Passionate Pilgrim:  Being the Narrative of an Oddly Dramatic Year in the Life of Henry Calverly, 3rd (1919)
Hills of Han: A Romantic Incident (1919) 
In Red and Gold (1921)
Goldie Green (1922)
Hattie of Hollywood (serialized in Photoplay, July–December 1922)
Silk : A Legend as Narrated in the Journals and Correspondence of Jan Po (1923)
The Moment of Beauty (1925)
The Entertaining Angel (1926)
"Old Concord, Seen through Western Spectacles" (1926)
Anabel at Sea (1927)
Lady Can Do (1929)
Bad Penny (1933)
Rise and Fight Againe:  The Story of a Life-Long Friend (1935)

References

External links

 
 
 
 

1874 births
1936 deaths
19th-century American novelists
20th-century American novelists
American male novelists
19th-century American male writers
20th-century American male writers